The Mitsubishi 4M4 engine is a range of four-cylinder diesel piston engines from Mitsubishi Motors, first introduced in the second generation of their Montero/Pajero/Shogun SUVs. They superseded the previous 4D5 engine family, main differences are enlarged displacements and the utilization of one or two over-head camshafts. Originally available only as a 2835 cc intercooled turbo, detail improvements in 1996 and a larger 3.2 litre option in 1999 served to improve power, torque, fuel economy and emissions. The final version has 3.0 litres swept volume and Common rail direct injection.

4M40 

Naturally aspirated 
Compression ratio 21.0:1, Zexel Distributor type injection pump,  at 4000 rpm,  at 2000 rpm

Applications:
 1996-1999 Canter (lightest-duty),  @ 2000 rpm

Intercooled Turbo Gen 1 
Compression ratio 21.0:1,  at 4000 rpm,  at 2000 rpm

Applications:
 1993-1999 Pajero (MK II, MKII Blister Fender)
 1996-2013 Mitsubishi Type 73 Light Truck
 1998-2003 Triton/L200 Sport 4x4
 1999-2009 Mitsubishi Colt LDV 4x4

Intercooled Turbo Gen 2 
Compression ratio 21.0:1, Zexel Electronically controlled  or Mechanical controlled distributor type Injection Pump,  at 4000 rpm,  at 2000 rpm

Applications:
 2003-2006 Triton/L200 Sport 4x4
 1994-2006 L400 Delica

4M41 
Inline 4-cylinder DOHC 16 valve, Bore x Stroke ,

Intercooled turbo 
Compression ratio 17.0:1, Zexel Electronic control type distributor type pump (direct injection inside diesel tube) or Denso Common Rail direct injection,  at 4000 rpm,  at 2000-3000 rpm

Applications:
1999-2006 Pajero (MK III)
2005-2011 Triton/L200/Strada
2006- Pajero (Philippine Domestic Market)
2008-2011 Pajero Sport/Montero Sport

Variable geometry intercooled turbo 
Compression ratio 17.0:1 or 16.0:1, Denso Common Rail Direct Injection

Applications:
2006-2009 Pajero (MK IV),  at 3800 rpm,  at 2000 rpm
2010–2022 Pajero, (MK IV)  at 3800 rpm,  at 2000 rpm

4M42 

OAT , Applications:
 2001-2007 Mitsubishi Fuso Canter
CR , Applications:
 2007-2010 Mitsubishi Fuso Canter, 92 kW
 2007-2010 Mitsubishi Fuso Canter, 107 kW

See also 
 List of Mitsubishi engines
 List of Mitsubishi Fuso engines

4M4
Straight-four engines
Diesel engines by model